Round-robin may refer to:

Computing
 Round-robin DNS, a technique for dealing with redundant Internet Protocol service hosts
 Round-robin networks, communications networks made up of radio nodes organized in a mesh topology
 Round-robin scheduling, an algorithm for assigning equal time-slices to different processes on a computer
 Round-robin item allocation, an algorithm for fairly allocating indivisible objects among people

Communication
 Round-robin (document), a document signed by several parties in a circle in order to hide the identity of the leader
 Round-robin letter, a news-filled letter typically accompanying a Christmas card
 Round-Robin Letter (Spanish–American War), a letter written in the United States Army during the Spanish–American War in 1898

Other uses
 Round-robin story, a collaborative piece of fiction or storytelling 
 Round-robin test, an interlaboratory test performed independently several times
 Round-robin tournament, a competition where each contestant meets all other contestants in turn
 Round-robin start, a possible ordering of turns in a turn-based game
 Round-robin bet, a type of wager offered by UK bookmakers, covering three selections

See also
 RRDtool, a round-robin database tool
 Modular arithmetic, a system of arithmetic for integers, where numbers "wrap around" upon reaching a certain value